Masqualero (1983–1991) was a Norwegian jazz group. Originally named "The Arild Andersen/Jon Christensen Quintet", the group soon changed its name to Masqualero in celebration of the Wayne Shorter composition.  Masqualero recorded four albums, three of which were awarded the Spellemannsprisen. The group were considered an important influence on the evolution of Nordic jazz and have subsequently become known as a 'Norwegian supergroup'.

Biography
Conceived by Arild Andersen (double bass) and Jon Christensen (drums) as a vehicle for their talents, the ensemble assumed a group dynamic with the inclusion of Jon Balke (keyboards), Tore Brunborg (saxophone) and Nils Petter Molvær (trumpet), all of whom contributed compositions to the group's recordings. The group dynamic was considered by Andersen to be an important component of Masqualero's sound, with a keen focus on musical interplay such that no single player was a soloist or leader. Balke left the group following the release of Bande a Part in 1986, to be replaced by Frode Alnæs (guitar) on Masqualero's third album, Aero. The group performed as a quartet for their final album, Re-Enter, recording with neither a pianist or guitarist. 

As frequent recipients of the prestigious Spellemannprisen, Masqualero are influential for being an early distillation of the Nordic or Scandinavian jazz style, a style which has continued to be developed by its original members through other musical projects.

In recent interviews Andersen has expressed regret that the band changed its name to 'Masqualero', since both he and Christensen were well known in Scandinavia and even internationally. Recognition of Masqualero's music was therefore lower than it should have been, while the name also gave a false impression of the group's music. While performing in Santa Monica, Andersen has noted that audience members, who were unfamiliar with the group's music, thought Masqualero was a "Mexican salsa band".

Honors
 Spellemannprisen 1983 for Masqualero
 Spellemannprisen 1986 for Bande a Part
 Spellemannprisen 1991 for Re-Enter

Discography
 Masqualero (Odin, 1983)
 Bande a Part (ECM, 1986)
 Aero (ECM, 1988)
 Re-Enter (ECM, 1991)

References

External links
Masqualero at Arild Andersen Official Website

Norwegian jazz ensembles
Musical groups established in 1982
1982 establishments in Norway
Musical groups from Oslo
Spellemannprisen winners
ECM Records artists